Machine Gun Fellatio were an Australian alternative rock band, formed in 1997. They were well known for their provocative on-stage antics and humorous lyrics, as well as the musical merit of their songs. Their outrage-provoking name (coined by an early associate of the band who devised the term from a philosophy exercise) gives some idea of the attitude that pervades the band's work. They released three studio albums, three EPs and three singles before breaking up in 2005.

History

1997–1999: Formation and Love Comes to an End 
Machine Gun Fellatio were formed when members of two Sydney bands, Vrag and Limebunny, combined in 1997. The bands had previously collaborated on projects and had released a compilation record, Unsound Sounds, which included a track by Vrag, "Isaac or Fuzz". "Isaac or Fuzz" consists of parts of a voice message left on a record company answering machine asking for the name of the song that goes "Da da da da...." (the song consists mostly humming of the tune "Reach Up" by the Paul Oakenfold-related project Perfecto Allstarz) put to a fast dance beat. In an interview Glenn Dormand (aka Chit Chat Von Loopin Stab) explained "We got a wrong number on our answering machine. We rang the number back. It was a local Pizza Hut. Basically, they said 'Isaac hasn't been here for a long time, and Fuzz isn't reliable either'." The song received significant airplay on national youth broadcaster Triple J. To capitalise on the success of the song they consolidated the band lineup, with Dave Arroyo and Glenn Dormand (Chit Chat Von Loopin Stab) on vocals and keyboards, Warrick Leggo (LoveShark) on guitar and Ross Johnston (3kShort) on bass, guitar and keyboards, and released their debut EP Love Comes to an End.

There were reportedly less than 500 copies of Love Comes to an End in existence, Matt Ford, (Pinky Beecroft) once stated in an interview they dumped boxes of their first EP in a skip when they realized they would never sell them. This EP is also referred to as Isaac or Fuzz, after their record label stuck stickers proclaiming that it contained the single "Isaac Or Fuzz" to try to increase sales by capitalising on the air play of the song on Triple J.

Ford later joined the band as singer, keyboardist, after leaving Limebunny and turning down an offer to join the band The Whitlams, with whom he helped write their hit song, "No Aphrodisiac", together with Dormand. The band was also joined by Christa Hughes (KK Juggy – the Ks standing for "knickers" and "knockers"), Glenn Abbott (Bryan Ferrysexual) on drums and Maree Bonner (The Widow Jones) on vocals and keyboards completing the band's line-up.

2000–2005: Bring It On!, Paging Mr. Strike and On Ice
Their first release under this arrangement was the song "Mutha Fukka on a Motorcycle". The lyrics were based on something sung by a party guest at one of the member's homes.

In September 2000, they released their debut studio album, Bring It On, on Mushroom Records.

In 2002, they performed live at the Big Day Out festivals, Homebake, Livid, the Woodford Folk Festival and Gone South.

Their second album Paging Mr. Strike was released in 2002, containing the band's most popular single, "Rollercoaster", which displayed more radio-friendly lyrics and was used in a commercial for Just Jeans. In 2003 the album was followed by a two-disc edition titled 2nd Page for Mr. Strike, which contained a second disc of remixes and rare tracks.

The group caused some controversy for their wild live performances which often involved both male and female nudity, light bondage gear and implied sexual intercourse with their instruments. After a Student Union organised performance at the University of Melbourne, fellow Victorian universities RMIT University and Swinburne University of Technology cancelled their scheduled performances because of the band's lewd behaviour at Melbourne University. This did not stop other Australian universities in New South Wales, Queensland, Western Australia and Tasmania allowing the band to perform on their campuses and did not stop Melbourne University hiring the band again the following year.

The Widow Jones left the group in 2004 and was replaced by Connie Mitchell (Feyonce), who later became known as the lead singer of Sneaky Sound System. Pinky Beecroft moved to Melbourne to get away from the band and to deal with drug-related health problems. The band's last album, On Ice, was released the same year and was met with a relatively muted response and the band decided to break up the following year. Issues listed as contributing to the break up include burn out, excessive drug use and creative differences.

2005–present: After the Split
Since the split, various band members have since moved on to other projects:
 Pinky Beecroft formed Pinky Beecroft and the White Russians, whose name was later shortened to just The White Russians.
 3kShort tours with White Knuckle Fever a duet he formed with Celia Curtis of Circus Bizarre and performs with Vashti Hughes in her show Mum's In.
 LoveShark formed the Outer Space Cowboys with 3kShort and played gigs around Sydney.
 Chit Chat Von Loopin Stab became a TV Presenter on Foxtel and now works as a film director on the Stories of Our Town project
 KK Juggy frequently appears on the Big Day Out's Lilyworld (formerly Lilypad) stage, hosting burlesque shows and other similar ventures. She performed as a member of the highly regarded circus troupe Circus Oz for three years then toured and released an album of jazz and blues classics with her father Dick Hughes. Most recently she has released an album of music with her band the Honky Tonk Shonks.
 Bryan Ferrysexual (Glenn Abbott) had another band The Bryan Ferrysexual Experience which broke up shortly after MGF did. He later formed Super Massive with singer-writer Malina Hamilton-Smith.
 Feyonce (Connie Mitchell) has since gone on to be one of the lead singers of the Sydney-based band Sneaky Sound System.

Members 
 Bryan Ferrysexual (Glenn Abbott)—drums
 Chit Chat Von Loopin Stab (Glenn Dormand)—keyboard and vocals
 KK Juggy (Christa Hughes)—vocals
 LoveShark (Warrick Leggo)—guitar
 Pinky Beecroft (Matt Ford)—vocals and keyboards
 3kShort (Ross Johnston)—bass, guitar and keyboard
 The Widow Jones (Maree Bonner)—vocals and keyboard (left in 2004)
 Feyonce (Connie Mitchell)—vocals (2004–2005)
 Jack Hammer (Guy Fleming)—vocals and keyboard (1997)
 Chris Fegan—guitar (1997)

Discography

Studio albums

Compilation albums

Extended plays

Singles

Notes

Awards and nominations

ARIA Music Awards
The ARIA Music Awards is an annual awards ceremony that recognises excellence, innovation, and achievement across all genres of Australian music. They commenced in 1987.

! 
|-
| 2002
|  "Girl of My Dreams (Is Giving Me Nightmares)"
| ARIA Award for Breakthrough Artist - Single
| 
|
|-

References 

Australian alternative rock groups
Musical groups from Sydney
Musical groups established in 1997
Musical groups disestablished in 2005